The Moulin de Vertain, also known as the Moulin Blanc and the Moulin de Briques is a unique windmill in Templeuve-en-Pévèle, Nord, France which was built in the late 15th century and has been restored to working order. Although it looks like a tower mill externally, it is technically akin to a post mill in internal construction and operation.

History 
A post mill stood on this site in 1328. It was owned by Anchin Abbey. A mill on this site was burnt in 1616 as an act of war. The current mill was built in the 15th century, It was standing by 1669, although at that time it only had one pair of  diameter millstones and was owned by Henin Robert, Lord of Vertain and Angremont. By 1771, the mill had two pairs of millstones. It was then owned by the Marquis of Aigremont until the time of the French Revolution. On 24 vendémiaire 6 (15 October 1798) the mill was sold to a person named Masse, its former owner the Marquis of Aigremont having fled France.

In 1824, the mill was owned by Jean Baptiste Castelain, miller. It was sold to M. Havez-Debuchy, a grain merchant of Templeuve, in 1836. By 1849, the mill was in the ownership of Louis Alexandre and Henri Havez of Wazemmes. It had passed to Jean Louis Havez, a butcher of Lille, by 1876. In 1887, the Moulin de Vertain was owned by the widow of Louis Havet-Vanhoverberghe. In 1908, the mill was in the ownership of Paul de Baratte, a notary in Paris. At this time it was painted white and known as the Moulin Blanc. It was also better known as the Moulin de Briques. It was in that year that its last miller, Jean-Baptiste Houze, died. His widow completed outstanding orders and then the mill ceased work to be eventually abandoned.

The mill was damaged by the Germans during World War I on numerous occasions. The mill's cap was restored in 1930. It was still in good condition post-World War II. By 1965, the mill was owned by Georges Delapalme-Baratte and Jeanne Cousin, née Baratte. In 1972, the mill was again derelict and the first steps were taken to save it. In 1973, The International Molinological Society held their third symposium at Arnhem, Gelderland, Netherlands. A motion was put before the members that the Moulin de Vertain should be saved, and all present signed it. Copies of the motion were passed to various national and local government agencies. On 23 July, the local commune decided to acquire the mill and the General Council of the Nord department accepted that the mill should be saved, and gave a grant to the local commune. The Ministry of Cultural Affairs took steps to list the mill, a process that took five years. In 1975, the Association Régionale des Amis des Moulins Nord-Pas-de-Calais (ARAM) had a tarpaulin placed over the mill and some of the machinery was removed for safe keeping. On 8 August 1978, the mill was listed. Its listing number is 98631. This freed up grant money for the restoration, which would take about 1,000,000 French francs to complete.

Restoration began in January 1980, with the tower being refurbished. The top  of the tower was removed and rebuilt, with bricks being replaced as necessary elsewhere. A new oak main post was cut at the Vrand sawmill in La Flamengrie (Avesnois). The tree had stood in the Forêt de Mormal. Another tree from that forest, which had been blown down in a storm, was cut at the Péter Sawmill, Lapugnoy, Pas-de-Calais and a sawmill at Felleries, Pas-de-Calais. A large iroko tree trunk, containing  of timber was cut at a sawmill in Ghent, East Flanders, Belgium. The cap and floors were reconstructed at ARAMs base in Villeneuve-d'Ascq. The completed frame was transported to Templeuve on 7 June 1982 and it was craned into the mill on 22 June. The cap was then covered with chestnut shingles during July and August 1982. A new oak windshaft was made, and a new cast iron poll end affixed to it. The head and tail wheels were made in February and March 1983 and fitted to the windshaft. The whole assembly was then fitted to the mill on 26 May. Stone nuts were obtained second hand, one from a mill at Offekerque, Pas-de-Calais and the other from a mill at Cappels. The roof was then completed, along with the remainder of the internal work. The tailpole was also fitted, with some timber being new iroko and other timber coming from a pair of sails of a mill in Wormhout. Following a break during 1984, the restoration of the mill was completed in 1985 with the fitting of new sails, made by Peel Brothers, Gistel, West Flanders, Belgium. The restored mill was officially opened on 15 June 1985. The brick tower formerly had three iron hoops around it to reinforce the structure. These were removed when the mill was restored by ARAM. The Moulin de Vertain is listed as a site classé, No. IA59001425.

Similar mills 

At least two other mills of this construction are known to have existed. One at Templemars, which was rebuilt from a conventional tower mill to this system in 1571. It had been demolished by the time of the French Revolution. The other was at Betekom, Flemish Brabant, Belgium, which was later converted to a conventional tower mill. The empty tower still stands.

Description 

Although resembling a tower mill externally, the mill is unique in its construction. A centre post, to which the floors are attached, runs through the mill. The cap and floors are fixed to this, and the whole rotates within the mill tower. Fifteen wooden rollers support the whole at the top of the tower, as a conventional curb would support the cap of a tower mill. The mill was constructed in this way to enable it to be worked by one man. It was said that a child of 15 or 16 could work such a mill. This system was probably invented by Gilles de Lannoy.

They are carried on a wooden windshaft with a cast iron poll end. The windshaft carries a head wheel of  diameter and a tail wheel of  diameter. One of the two pairs of millstones is  diameter.

Millers 
1669 Jean de Lespaignol
1777 Jean Baptiste Wartelle
1824 Jean Baptiste Castelain
1888–1908 Jean-Baptiste Houze

References for above:

References

External links 

Windmills in France
Grinding mills in France
Agricultural buildings in France
15th-century architecture
Monuments historiques of Nord (French department)